New media art includes artworks designed and produced by means of electronic media technologies, comprising virtual art, computer graphics, computer animation, digital art, interactive art, sound art, Internet art, video games, robotics, 3D printing, and cyborg art. The term defines itself by the thereby created artwork, which differentiates itself from that deriving from conventional visual arts (i.e. architecture, painting, sculpture, etc.). New Media art has origins in the worlds of science, art, and performance. Some common themes found in new media art include databases, political and social activism, Afrofuturism, feminism, and identity, a ubiquitous theme found throughout is the incorporation of new technology into the work. The emphasis on medium is a defining feature of much contemporary art and many art schools and major universities now offer majors in "New Genres" or "New Media" and a growing number of graduate programs have emerged internationally. New media art may involve degrees of interaction between artwork and observer or between the artist and the public, as is the case in performance art. Yet, as several theorists and curators have noted, such forms of interaction, social exchange, participation, and transformation do not distinguish new media art but rather serve as a common ground that has parallels in other strands of contemporary art practice. Such insights emphasize the forms of cultural practice that arise concurrently with emerging technological platforms, and question the focus on technological media per se. New Media art involves complex curation and preservation practices that make collecting, installing, and exhibiting the works harder than most other mediums. Many cultural centers and museums have been established to cater to the advanced needs of new media art.

History 

The origins of new media art can be traced to the moving image inventions of the 19th century such as the phenakistiscope (1833), the praxinoscope (1877) and Eadweard Muybridge's zoopraxiscope (1879). From the 1900s through the 1960s, various forms of kinetic and light art, from Thomas Wilfred's 'Lumia' (1919) and 'Clavilux' light organs to Jean Tinguely's self-destructing sculpture Homage to New York (1960) can be seen as progenitors of new media art.

Steve Dixon in his book Digital Performance: New Technologies in Theatre, Dance and Performance Art argues that the early twentieth century avant-garde art movement Futurism was the birthplace of the merging of technology and performance art. Some early examples of performance artists who experimented with then state-of-the-art lighting, film, and projection include dancers Loïe Fuller and Valentine de Saint-Point. Cartoonist Winsor McCay performed in sync with an animated Gertie the Dinosaur on tour in 1914. By the 1920s many Cabaret acts began incorporating film projection into performances.

Robert Rauschenberg's piece Broadcast (1959), composed of three interactive re-tunable radios and a painting, is considered one of the first examples of interactive art. German artist Wolf Vostell experimented with television sets in his (1958) installation TV De-collages. Vostell's work influenced Nam June Paik, who created sculptural installations featuring hundreds of television sets that displayed distorted and abstract footage.

Beginning in Chicago during the 1970s, there was a surge of artists experimenting with video art and combining recent computer technology with their traditional mediums, including sculpture, photography, and graphic design. Many of the artists involved were grad students at The School of the Art Institute of Chicago, including Kate Horsfield and Lyn Blumenthal, who co-founded the Video Data Bank in 1976. Another artists involved was Donna Cox, she collaborated with mathematician George Francis and computer scientist Ray Idaszak on the project Venus in Time which depicted mathematical data as 3D digital sculptures named for their similarities to paleolithic Venus statues. In 1982 artist Ellen Sandor and her team called (art)n Laboratory created the medium called PHSCologram, which stands for photography, holography, sculpture, and computer graphics. Her visualization of the AIDS virus was depicted on the cover of IEEE Computer Graphics and Applications in November 1988. At the University of Illinois in 1989, members of the Electronic Visualization Laboratory Carolina Cruz-Neira, Thomas DeFanti, and Daniel J. Sandin collaborated to create what is known as CAVE or Cave Automatic Virtual Environment an early virtual reality immersion using rear projection. 
In 1983, Roy Ascott introduced the concept of "distributed authorship" in his worldwide telematic project La Plissure du Texte for Frank Popper's "Electra" at the Musée d'Art Moderne de la Ville de Paris. The development of computer graphics at the end of the 1980s and real time technologies in the 1990s combined with the spreading of the Web and the Internet favored the emergence of new and various forms of interactive art by Ken Feingold,  Lynn Hershman Leeson, David Rokeby, Ken Rinaldo, Perry Hoberman, Tamas Waliczky; telematic art by Roy Ascott, Paul Sermon, Michael Bielický; Internet art by Vuk Ćosić, Jodi; virtual and immersive art by Jeffrey Shaw, Maurice Benayoun, Monika Fleischmann, and large scale urban installation by Rafael Lozano-Hemmer. In Geneva, the Centre pour l'Image Contemporaine or CIC coproduced with Centre Georges Pompidou from Paris and the Museum Ludwig in Cologne the first internet video archive of new media art.

Simultaneously advances in biotechnology have also allowed artists like Eduardo Kac to begin exploring DNA and genetics as a new art medium.

Influences on new media art have been the theories developed around interaction, hypertext, databases, and networks. Important thinkers in this regard have been Vannevar Bush and Theodor Nelson, whereas comparable ideas can be found in the literary works of Jorge Luis Borges, Italo Calvino, and Julio Cortázar.

Themes
In the book New Media Art, Mark Tribe and Reena Jana named several themes that contemporary new media art addresses, including computer art, collaboration, identity, appropriation, open sourcing, telepresence, surveillance, corporate parody, as well as intervention and hacktivism. In the book Postdigitale, Maurizio Bolognini suggested that new media artists have one common denominator, which is a self-referential relationship with the new technologies, the result of finding oneself inside an epoch-making transformation determined by technological development.

New media art does not appear as a set of homogeneous practices, but as a complex field converging around three main elements: 1) the art system, 2) scientific and industrial research, and 3) political-cultural media activism. There are significant differences between scientist-artists, activist-artists and technological artists closer to the art system, who not only have different training and technocultures, but have different artistic production. This should be taken into account in examining the several themes addressed by new media art.

Non-linearity can be seen as an important topic to new media art by artists developing interactive, generative, collaborative, immersive artworks like Jeffrey Shaw or Maurice Benayoun who explored the term as an approach to looking at varying forms of digital projects where the content relays on the user's experience. This is a key concept since people acquired the notion that they were conditioned to view everything in a linear and clear-cut fashion.  Now, art is stepping out of that form and allowing for people to build their own experiences with the piece. Non-linearity describes a project that escape from the conventional linear narrative coming from novels, theater plays and movies. Non-linear art usually requires audience participation or at least, the fact that the "visitor" is taken into consideration by the representation, altering the displayed content. The participatory aspect of new media art, which for some artists has become integral, emerged from Allan Kaprow's Happenings and became with Internet, a significant component of contemporary art.

The inter-connectivity and interactivity of the internet, as well as the fight between corporate interests, governmental interests, and public interests that gave birth to the web today, inspire a lot of current new media art.

Databases 
One of the key themes in new media art is to create visual views of databases. Pioneers in this area include Lisa Strausfeld, Martin Wattenberg and Alberto Frigo. From 2004-2014 George Legrady's piece "Making Visible the Invisible" displayed the normally unseen library metadata of items recently checked out at the Seattle Public Library on six LCD monitors behind the circulation desk. Database aesthetics holds at least two attractions to new media artists: formally, as a new variation on non-linear narratives; and politically as a means to subvert what is fast becoming a form of control and authority.

Political and social activism 
Many new media art projects also work with themes like politics and social consciousness, allowing for social activism through the interactive nature of the media. New media art includes "explorations of code and user interface; interrogations of archives, databases, and networks; production via automated scraping, filtering, cloning, and recombinatory techniques; applications of user-generated content (UGC) layers; crowdsourcing ideas on social- media platforms; narrowcasting digital selves on "free" websites that claim copyright; and provocative performances that implicate audiences as participants".

Afrofuturism 
Afrofuturism is an interdisciplinary genre that explores the African diaspora experience, predominantly in the United States, by deconstructing the past and imagining the future through the themes of technology, science fiction, and fantasy. Musician Sun Ra, believed to be one of the founders of Afrofuturism, thought a blend of technology and music could help humanity overcome the ills of society. His band, The Sun Ra Arkestra, combined traditional Jazz with sound and performance art and were among the first musicians to perform with a synthesizer. The twenty-first century has seen a resurgence of Afrofuturism aesthetics and themes with artists and cooperation's like Jessi Jumanji and Black Quantum Futurism and art educational centers like Black Space in Durham, North Carolina.

Feminism and the female experience 
Japanese artist Mariko Mori's multimedia installation piece Wave UFO (1999-2003) sought to examine the science and perceptions behind the study of consciousness and neuroscience. Exploring the ways that these fields undertake research in a materially reductionist manner. Mori's work emphasized the need for these fields to become more holistic and incorporate incites and understanding of the world from philosophy and the humanities. Swiss artist Pipilotti Rist's (2008) immersive video installation Pour Your Body Out explores the dichotomy of beauty and the grotesque in the natural world and their relation to the female experience. The large-scale 360-degree installation featured breast-shaped projectors and circular pink pillows that invited viewers to relax and immerse themselves in the vibrant colors, psychedelic music, and partake in meditation and yoga. American filmmaker and artist Lynn Hersman Leeson explores in her films the themes of identity, technology and the erasure of women's roles and contributions to technology. Her (1999) film Conceiving Ada depicts a computer scientist and new media artist named Emmy as she attempts and succeeds at creating a way to communicate through cyberspace with Ada Lovelace, an Englishwoman who created the first computer program in the 1840s via a form of artificial intelligence.

Identity 
With its roots in outsider art, New Media has been an ideal medium for an artist to explore the topics of identity and representation. In Canada, Indigenous multidisciplinary artists like Cheryl L'Hirondelle and Kent Monkman have incorporated themes about gender, identity, activism, and colonization in their work. Monkman, a Cree artist, performs and appears as their alter ego Miss Chief Eagle Testickle, in film, photography, painting, installation, and performance art. Monkman describes Miss Chief as a representation of a two-spirit or non-binary persona that does not fall under the traditional description of drag.

Future of new media art 
The emergence of 3D printing has introduced a new bridge to new media art, joining the virtual and the physical worlds.  The rise of this technology has allowed artists to blend the computational base of new media art with the traditional physical form of sculpture.  A pioneer in this field was artist Jonty Hurwitz who created the first known anamorphosis sculpture using this technique.

Longevity 
As the technologies used to deliver works of new media art such as film, tapes, web browsers, software and operating systems become obsolete, New Media art faces serious issues around the challenge to preserve artwork beyond the time of its contemporary production. Currently, research projects into New media art preservation are underway to improve the preservation and documentation of the fragile media arts heritage (see DOCAM - Documentation and Conservation of the Media Arts Heritage).

Methods of preservation exist, including the translation of a work from an obsolete medium into a related new medium, the digital archiving of media (see the Rhizome ArtBase, which holds over 2000 works, and the Internet Archive), and the use of emulators to preserve work dependent on obsolete software or operating system environments.

Around the mid-90s, the issue of storing works in digital form became a concern. Digital art such as moving images, multimedia, interactive programs, and computer-generated art has different properties than physical artwork such as oil paintings and sculptures. Unlike analog technologies, a digital file can be recopied onto a new medium without any deterioration of content. One of the problems with preserving digital art is that the formats continuously change over time. Former examples of transitions include that from 8-inch floppy disks to 5.25-inch floppies, 3-inch diskettes to CD-ROMs, and DVDs to flash drives. On the horizon is the obsolescence of flash drives and portable hard drives, as data is increasingly held in online cloud storage.

Museums and galleries thrive off of being able to accommodate the presentation and preservation of physical artwork. New media art challenges the original methods of the art world when it comes to documentation, its approach to collection and preservation. Technology continues to advance, and the nature and structure of art organizations and institutions will remain in jeopardy. The traditional roles of curators and artist are continually changing, and a shift to new collaborative models of production and presentation is needed.

Preservation 
see also Conservation and restoration of new media art

New media art encompasses various mediums all which require their own preservation approaches. Due to the vast technical aspects involved no established digital preservation guidelines fully encompass the spectrum of new media art. New media art falls under the category of "complex digital object" in the Digital Curation Centre's digital curation lifecycle model which involves specialized or totally unique preservation techniques.  Complex digital objects preservation has an emphasis on the inherent connection of the components of the piece.

Education
In New Media programs, students are able to get acquainted with the newest forms of creation and communication. New Media students learn to identify what is or isn't "new" about certain technologies. Science and the market will always present new tools and platforms for artists and designers. Students learn how to sort through new emerging technological platforms and place them in a larger context of sensation, communication, production, and consumption.

When obtaining a bachelor's degree in New Media, students will primarily work through practice of building experiences that utilize new and old technologies and narrative. Through the construction of projects in various media, they acquire technical skills, practice vocabularies of critique and analysis, and gain familiarity with historical and contemporary precedents.

In the United States, many Bachelor's and Master's level programs exist with concentrations on Media Art, New Media, Media Design, Digital Media and Interactive Arts.

Leading art theorists and historians

Leading art theorists and historians in this field include Roy Ascott, Lev Manovich, Maurice Benayoun, Christine Buci-Glucksmann, Jack Burnham, Mario Costa, Edmond Couchot, Fred Forest, Oliver Grau, Margot Lovejoy,  Robert C. Morgan, Dominique Moulon, Christiane Paul, Catherine Perret, Frank Popper, and Edward A. Shanken.

Types
The term New Media Art is generally applied to disciplines such as:

 Artistic computer game modification
 ASCII art
 Bio Art
 Cyberformance
 Computer art
 Critical making
 Digital art
 Demoscene
 Digital poetry
 Electronic art
 Experimental musical instrument building
 Evolutionary art
 Fax art
 Generative art
 Glitch art
 Hypertext
 Information art
 Interactive art
 Kinetic art
 Light art
 Motion graphics
 Net art
 Performance art
 Radio art
 Robotic art
 Software art
 Sound art
 Systems art
 Telematic art
 Video art
 Video games
 Virtual art

Artists

Cultural centres
 Australian Network for Art and Technology
 Center for Art and Media Karlsruhe
 Centre pour l'Image Contemporaine
 Eyebeam Art and Technology Center
 Foundation for Art and Creative Technology
 Gray Area Foundation for the Arts
 Harvestworks
 InterAccess
 Los Angeles Center for Digital Art (LACDA)
 Netherlands Media Art Institute
 NTT InterCommunication Center
 Rhizome (organization)
 RIXC
 School for Poetic Computation (SFPC)
 School of the Art Institute of Chicago
 Squeaky Wheel: Film and Media Arts Center
 V2 Institute for the Unstable Media
 WORM

See also

 ART/MEDIA
 Artmedia
 Aspect magazine
 Culture jamming
 Digital media
 Digital puppetry
 Electronic Language International Festival
 Expanded Cinema
 Experiments in Art and Technology
 Interactive film
 Interactive media
 Intermedia
 LA Freewaves
 Net.art
 New media art festivals
 New media artist
 New media art journals
 New media art preservation
 Perpetual Art Machine
 Remix culture
 VJing

References

Further reading
 
 Maurice Benayoun, The Dump, 207 Hypotheses for Committing Art, bilingual (English/French) Fyp éditions, France, July 2011, 
 Timothy Murray, Derrick de Kerckhove, Oliver Grau, Kristine Stiles, Jean-Baptiste Barrière, Dominique Moulon, Jean-Pierre Balpe, Maurice Benayoun Open Art, Nouvelles éditions Scala, 2011, French version, 
 Vannevar Bush (1945). "As We May Think" online at As We May Think – The Atlantic Monthly
 Roy Ascott (2003). Telematic Embrace: Visionary Theories of Art, Technology, and Consciousness (Ed.) Edward A. Shanken. Berkeley: University of California Press. 
Barreto, Ricardo and Perissinotto,  Paula   “the_culture_of_immanence”, in Internet Art. Ricardo Barreto e Paula Perissinotto (orgs.). São Paulo, IMESP, 2002. .
 Jorge Luis Borges (1941). "The Garden of Forking Paths." Editorial Sur.
 Nicolas Bourriaud, (1997) Relational Aesthetics, Dijon: Les Presses du Réel, 2002, orig. 1997
 Christine Buci-Glucksmann, "L’art à l’époque virtuel", in Frontières esthétiques de l’art, Arts 8, Paris: L’Harmattan, 2004
 Christine Buci-Glucksmann, La folie du voir: Une esthétique du virtuel, Galilée, 2002
 Valentino Catricalà, Media Art. Towards a New Definition of Arts in the Age of Technology. Siena: Gli Ori, 2015
 Sarah Cook & Beryl Graham, Rethinking Curating: Art After New Media, Cambridge, Mass.: MIT Press, 2010. .
 Sarah Cook & Beryl Graham, "Curating New Media", Art Monthly 261, November 2002. online at Art Monthly
 Sarah Cook, Verina Gfader, Beryl Graham & Axel Lapp, A Brief History of Curating New Media Art - Conversations with Curators, Berlin: The Green Box, 2010. .
 Sarah Cook, Verina Gfader, Beryl Graham & Axel Lapp, A Brief History of Working with New Media Art - Conversations with Artists, Berlin: The Green Box, 2010. .
 Fleischmann, Monika and Reinhard, Ulrike (eds.). Digital Transformations - Media Art as at the Interface between Art, Science, Economy and Society online at netzspannung.org, 2004, 
 Monika Fleischmann / Wolfgang Strauss (eds.) (2001). Proceedings of »CAST01//Living in Mixed Realities« Intl. Conf. On Communication of Art, Science and Technology, Fraunhofer IMK 2001, 401.  (Print),  (Internet).
 Gatti, Gianna Maria. (2010) The Technological Herbarium. Avinus Press, Berlin, 2010 (edited, translated from the Italian, and with a preface by Alan N. Shapiro). online at alan-shapiro.com
 Charlie Gere, (2002) Digital Culture, Reaktion 
 Charlie Gere, (2006) White Heat, Cold Logic: Early British Computer Art, co-edited with Paul Brown, Catherine Mason and Nicholas Lambert, MIT Press/Leonardo Books
 Graham, Philip Mitchell, New Epoch Art, InterACTA: Journal of the Art Teachers Association of Victoria, Published by ACTA, Parkville, Victoria, No 4, 1990, Cited In APAIS. This database is available on the, Informit Online Internet Service or on CD-ROM, or on Australian Public Affairs - Full Text
 Oliver Grau (2003). Virtual Art: From Illusion to Immersion (Leonardo Book Series). Cambridge, Massachusetts: The MIT Press/Leonardo Books. .
 Oliver Grau (2007). (Ed.) MediaArtHistories. Cambridge, Massachusetts: The MIT Press/Leonardo Books. .
 Mark Hansen, (2004) New Philosophy for New Media (Cambridge, MA: MIT Press)
 Dick Higgins, ‘Intermedia’ (1966), reprinted in Donna De Salvo (ed.), Open Systems Rethinking Art c. 1970, London: Tate Publishing, 2005
 Lopes, Dominic McIver. (2009). A Philosophy of Computer Art. London: Routledge
 Lev Manovich (2001). The Language of New Media Cambridge, Massachusetts: The MIT Press/Leonardo Books. 
 Lev Manovich, Ten Key Texts on Digital Art: 1970-2000 Leonardo - Volume 35, Number 5, October 2002, pp. 567–569
 Christiane Paul, Challenges for a Ubiquitous Museum: Presenting and Preserving New Media
 Lev Manovich (2003. "New Media from Borges to HTML", The New Media Reader. MIT Press.
 Mondloch, Kate. Screens: Viewing Media Installation Art. Minneapolis: University of Minnesota Press, 2010. 
 Dominique Moulon, Tim Murray, Kristine Stiles, Derrick de Kerckhove, Oliver Grau Open Art, Maurice Benayoun, Nouvelles editions Scala, 2011, 
 Paul, Christiane (2003). Digital Art (World of Art series). London: Thames & Hudson. .
 Robert C. Morgan, Commentaries on the New Media Arts Pasadena, CA: Umbrella Associates,1992
 Janet Murray (2003). "Inventing the Medium", The New Media Reader. MIT Press.
 Frank Popper (2007) From Technological to Virtual Art, MIT Press/Leonardo Books
 Frank Popper (1997) Art of the Electronic Age, Thames & Hudson
 Edward A. Shanken "Selected Writings on Art and Technology"
 Edward A. Shanken Art and Electronic Media. London: Phaidon, 2009. 
 Mark Tribe and Reena Jana. New Media Art
 Rainer Usselmann, (2003) (PDF) "The Dilemma of Media Art: Cybernetic Serendipity at the ICA London", Cambridge, Massachusetts: The MIT Press/Leonardo Journal - Volume 36, Number 5, pp. 389–396
 Rainer Usselmann, (2002)  "About Interface: Actualisation and Totality", University of Southampton
 Wands, Bruce (2006). Art of the Digital Age, London: Thames & Hudson. .
 Whitelaw, Mitchell (2004). Metacreation: Art and Artificial Life Cambridge, Massachusetts: The MIT Press. .
 Steve Dietz, Collecting New Media Art: Just Like Anything Else, Only Different
 Anne-Cécile Worms, (2008) Arts Numériques: Tendances, Artistes, Lieux et Festivals  M21 Editions 2008 .
 Youngblood, Gene (1970). Expanded Cinema. New York. E.P. Dutton & Company.
  Juan Martín Prada, Prácticas artísticas e Internet en la época de las redes sociales, Editorial AKAL, Madrid, 2012, 
 New Media Faculty, (2011). "New Media", University of Illinois at Urbana-Champaign
  
 Bailey, Chris & Hazel Gardiner. (2010). Revisualizing Visual Culture. Surrey, UK: Ashgate Publishing.
 Jana, Reena and Mark Tribe. (2009). New Media Art. New York: Taschen.
 Dale Hudson and Patricia R. Zimmermann. (2009). “Taking Things Apart: Migratory Archives, Locative Media, and Micropublics.” Afterimage vol. 36 no. 4 (January/February), pp. 14–19.
 artists-with-/ Moss, Ceci. (2008). Thoughts on “New Media Artists v. Artists with Computers”. Rhizome
 Nechvatal, Joseph. (2013). Whither Art? David Joselit's Digital Art Problem. "Hyperallergic: Sensitive to Art & its Discontents."
 Joselit, David. (2012). After Art. Princeton: Princeton University Press. .
 Guertin, C. (2012). Digital prohibition: Piracy and authorship in new media art. London: Continuum International Pub. Group. .
 Catricalà, Valentino (2013). "Come l’avanguardia inventò il futuro. L’Optofono di Raoul Hausman, la 'visione elettromeccanica' di Lissitzky e le forme dell’energia", in "Imago. Rivista di studi sul cinema e i media", n. 7-8. (pp. 277–294).  
 Dale Hudson and Patricia R. Zimmermann. (2015). Thinking Through Digital Media Transnational Environments and Locative Places. New York: Palgrave Macmillan.  companion website with links to projects
Janez Strehovec (2016). Text as Ride. Electronic Literature and New Media Art. Morgentown: West Virginia University Press (Computing Literature book series)-

 
Mass media technology
Visual arts genres
New media
Digital art